The Stadion imeni Bohdana Markevycha (Bohdan Markevych Stadium) is a sports stadium in Vynnyky, Ukraine. It is the home field for FC Rukh Vynnyky. Named after the youth coach Bohdan Markevych.

In honor of Bohdan Markevych (1925–2002) a bronze monument that was supposed to delineate the coach teaching his son Myron football was erected as a tribute and memorial.

The stadium hosted the football representative tournament of the Ukrainian Army.

References

Football venues in Lviv